After Lately is an American television comedy. The series depicts, in mockumentary style, the behind the scenes goings-on at the office of the late-night talk show Chelsea Lately. The cast is made up of the actual writers and performers of Chelsea Lately, who play themselves as they suffer the indignities and relish the perks of show business, bicker and argue over trivial and petty matters, compete for show air time and personal approval from Chelsea, and produce a nightly late-night cable comedy show. Celebrity guest stars regularly appear, playing parody versions of themselves, interacting with Chelsea and the cast. The series began airing on E! on March 6, 2011.

Summary
After Lately is a faux reality show, purporting to expose the behind-the-scenes goings-on of Chelsea Handler's hit, late-night, E! network talk show, Chelsea Lately. In fact, it is a scripted comedy using a "show-about-a-show" concept, similar to The Larry Sanders Show (except that the show at the center of After Lately is a real show) and is, also, a satire of the personality flaws and skewed mindsets commonly associated with show business and celebrities. The performances are both scripted and improvised. The camera shots are intentionally meant to mimic a documentary-style, fly-on-the-wall point-of-view (a la, The Office and Parks and Recreation). The various cast members, writers, crew, associates, and even celebrity guests of Chelsea Lately are presented as an extended, dysfunctional 'family': pranking each other in childish ways; failed attempts to lie their way into gaining the favor of higher-status celebrities; bickering and arguing over mostly petty matters; and, constantly competing for show air time—and Chelsea's favor, while producing a nightly talk show. Handler, herself, appears in each episode: always portrayed as having an outwardly disdainful, domineering, and abusive—yet, secretly compassionate—attitude toward each staff member.

Cast
 Chelsea Handler
 Brad Wollack
 Chris Franjola
 Chuy Bravo
 Heather McDonald
 Jeff Wild
 Sarah Colonna
 Steve Marmalstein
 Roy Handler
 Josh Wolf (seasons 1–2)
 Fortune Feimster (seasons 2–3)
 Jen Kirkman (seasons 2–3)

Guest stars
Guest stars for After Lately include: Reese Witherspoon, Jennifer Aniston, Justin Bieber, Jane Fonda, Dave Grohl, James Van Der Beek, Jay Leno, Ross Mathews, Jenny McCarthy, Sharon Osbourne, Giuliana Rancic, Tori Spelling, Antonio Sabàto Jr., Loni Love, Natasha Leggero, Gary Valentine, Drew Pinsky, Geri Jewell, Vicki Gunvalson, Kate Beckinsale, Charlize Theron, Kathie Lee Gifford, Monica Potter, Kevin Nealon, Melissa Etheridge, Giancarlo Stanton, Kim Kardashian, Khloe Kardashian, Kourtney Kardashian, Kris Jenner.

Episodes

Season 1 (2011)

Season 2 (2011–12)

Season 3 (2013)

Production
After Lately is shown in a documentary style where cameras follow the staff members behind the scenes of Chelsea Lately, and many of the staff members sometimes have one-on-one time with the camera crew for Reality TV-style confessionals. Many of the stories told are inspired by actual events at the Chelsea Lately offices.

After Lately is executive produced by Chelsea Handler, Tom Brunelle and Jay Karas, Johnny Milord and Brad Wollack serve as Co-Executive Producers, in association with Borderline Amazing Productions. The first and second seasons each consisted of eight episodes airing on Sunday nights at 11 pm. Season  two premiered on November 27, 2011 at 11pm.

On April 27, 2012, After Lately was renewed for a third season. Season 3 debuted on February 25, 2013 in its new time slot on Mondays at 10:30pm.

Ratings
The series premiere averaged 1.2 million viewers and a .91 household rating. Season one averaged around one million viewers per episode and exceeded the E!'s primetime delivery by over +50%.

The season two premiere of After Lately recorded 1.254 million viewers, up 7% from the series premiere to set a new series high.

The season three premiere recorded 0.355 million viewers and a .2 household rating.

References

External links
 
 

2010s American mockumentary television series
2010s American parody television series
2011 American television series debuts
2013 American television series endings
American television spin-offs
E! original programming
English-language television shows
Reality television series parodies
Television series about television